Edward Arthur Lancaster (September 22, 1860 – January 4, 1916) was a Canadian politician.

Born in London, England, Lancaster was educated at the Public and High Schools of London, Ontario and at Osgoode Hall. He practised law in St. Catharines. In 1885, he married Mary H.C. Pettit. A lawyer by profession, he was first returned to Parliament in the general elections of 1900 for the Ontario electoral district of Lincoln and Niagara. A Conservative, he was re-elected in 1904, 1908, and 1911. He died in office in 1916 in St. Catharines.

References

1860 births
1916 deaths
Conservative Party of Canada (1867–1942) MPs
Members of the House of Commons of Canada from Ontario